Barbara Dittus (11 July 1939 – 25 June 2001) was a German film actress. She appeared in more than ninety films from 1959 to 2001.

Selected filmography

References

External links
 

1939 births
2001 deaths
People from Guben
German film actresses
German television actresses